Bertrand Badie (born 1950) is a French political scientist and international relations specialist, emeritus professor at Sciences Po. He is one of the most renowned French specialists in international relations.

Bibliography 
Bertrand Badie, The sociology of the State, University of Chicago Press, 1983, 
Bertrand Badie, The imported State, Stanford University Press, 2000
Bertrand Badie, Diplomacy of Connivance, Palgrave Macmillan US, 2012, 
Bertrand Badie, Humiliation in International Relations, Bloomsbury, 2017
Bertrand Badie, New perspectives on the international order, Palgrave, 2019
Bertrand Badie, Rethinking International relations, Elgar, 2020
Bertrand Badie, co-editor of The International Encyclopedia of Political Science (with Berg-Schlosser and Morlino), Sage, 2011 and Handbook of Political Science, Sage, 2020

References 

Living people
1950 births
French political scientists
INALCO alumni
International relations